All-American Girl: The Mary Kay Letourneau Story is a 2000 American television film based on the real-life story of Mary Kay Letourneau's repeated rape of one of her sixth-grade students. The film was broadcast on the USA Network on January 18, 2000 and was followed with a special entitled Letourneau: Live, which featured interviews with Letourneau and others involved with the scenario.

The lead role of Letourneau was played by actress Penelope Ann Miller and filming took place in Toronto during 1999. Letourneau cooperated with the film's producers. As she could not receive profits from the film per the "Son of Sam law", her fees were placed in a trust fund for her children. As a way of developing her role, Miller corresponded with Letourneau over the telephone.

Cast 

 Penelope Ann Miller as Mary Kay Letourneau
 Omar Anguiano as Vili Fualaau
 Mercedes Ruehl as Jane Newhall
 Rena Owen as Soona Fualaau
 Greg Spottiswood as Steve Letourneau
 Christopher Bondy as John Schmitz
 Janet-Laine Green as Mrs. Schmitz
 Gary Hudson as Charles Dunphy
 Robert Clark as Steven, Jr.
 Lori Hallier as Jan Griffin
 Julie Khaner as Det. Coughlin
 Philip Akin as Det. Albany 
 Chloe Brown as Girl Student 
 Nadia Capone as Susan Trenton

Reception 

Critical reception for All-American Girl was mixed. Charleston Daily Mail praised the film, writing "More than just a tawdry detour into the Jerry Springer/Ricki Lake cesspool of shock value, this film presents a sympathetic look at a confused woman who still contends that Vili is her destined soulmate, the love of her life." The Los Angeles Daily News was more mixed in their review, praising the filmmakers for putting " a little care and thought into their production" and that it did not "waste one's time or aggressively insult one's intelligence" while also stating that the film was "ultimately unsatisfying" and did not "provide much insight into the case". Variety panned the film overall, writing that "USA Network's "The Mary Kay Letourneau Story: All-American Girl" wastes a good opportunity to shed light on some really screwed up people. Despite Penelope Ann Miller's eerie resemblance to Seattle's infamous seductress, this factual telepic about the world's most "giving" teacher offers little insight and is buried underneath overblown production values."

See also 

 2000 in American television

References

External links 
 

2000 television films
2000 films
2000s biographical films
American biographical films
Biographical television films
Films about child sexual abuse
Films about scandalous teacher–student relationships
Films directed by Lloyd Kramer
Films set in Seattle
Films shot in Toronto
USA Network original films
2000s American films